This is a list of Ficus species, plants in the Moraceae family.  Plants of the World Online accepts 877 species.

A

 Ficus abelii 
 Ficus abscondita 
 Ficus abutilifolia 
 Ficus acamptophylla 
 Ficus aculeata 
 Ficus adelpha 
 Ficus adenosperma 
 Ficus adhatodifolia 
 Ficus adolphi-friderici 
 Ficus aequatorialis 
 Ficus albert-smithii 
 Ficus albipila 
 Ficus albomaculata 
 Ficus allutacea 
 Ficus alongensis 
 Ficus altissima 
 Ficus amadiensis 
 Ficus amazonica 
 Ficus americana 
 Ficus ampana 
 Ficus ampelos 
 Ficus amplissima 
 Ficus amplocarpa 
 Ficus ampulliformis 
 Ficus anamalayana 
 Ficus anastomosans 
 Ficus andamanica 
 Ficus androchaete 
 Ficus annulata 
 Ficus anserina 
 Ficus antandronarum 
 Ficus apiocarpa 
 Ficus apollinaris 
 Ficus araneosa 
 Ficus arawaensis 
 Ficus arbuscula 
 Ficus archboldiana 
 Ficus archeri 
 Ficus ardisioides 
 Ficus arfakensis 
 Ficus aripuanensis 
 Ficus armitii 
 Ficus arnottiana 
 Ficus aspera 
 Ficus asperifolia 
 Ficus asperiuscula 
 Ficus asperula 
 Ficus assamica 
 Ficus assimilis 
 Ficus atricha 
 Ficus aurantiacifolia 
 Ficus aurata 
 Ficus aurea 
 Ficus aureobrunnea 
 Ficus aureocordata 
 Ficus auricoma 
 Ficus auriculata 
 Ficus auriculigera 
 Ficus aurita 
 Ficus austrina

B

 Ficus austrocaledonica 
 Ficus baccaureoides 
 Ficus badiopurpurea 
 Ficus baeuerlenii 
 Ficus bahiensis 
 Ficus bakeri 
 Ficus balete 
 Ficus balica 
 Ficus bambusifolia 
 Ficus banahaensis 
 Ficus banosensis 
 Ficus baola 
 Ficus barba-jovis 
 Ficus barclayana 
 Ficus barraui 
 Ficus barteri 
 Ficus bataanensis 
 Ficus beccarii 
 Ficus beddomei 
 Ficus benghalensis 
 Ficus benguetensis 
 Ficus benjamina 
 Ficus bernaysii 
 Ficus bhotanica 
 Ficus biakensis 
 Ficus binnendykii 
 Ficus bistipulata 
 Ficus bivalvata 
 Ficus bizanae 
 Ficus blepharophylla 
 Ficus boanensis 
 Ficus bojeri 
 Ficus boliviana 
 Ficus bonijesulapensis 
 Ficus boninsimae 
 Ficus borneensis 
 Ficus botryocarpa 
 Ficus botryoides 
 Ficus bougainvillei 
 Ficus brachyclada 
 Ficus brachypoda 
 Ficus bracteata 
 Ficus brenesii 
 Ficus brevibracteata 
 Ficus brittonii 
 Ficus broadwayi 
 Ficus bruneiensis 
 Ficus brunneoaurata 
 Ficus brusii 
 Ficus bubu 
 Ficus bubulia 
 Ficus bukitrayaensis 
 Ficus bullenei 
 Ficus buntaensis 
 Ficus burretiana 
 Ficus burtt-davyi 
 Ficus bussei

C

 Ficus caatingae 
 Ficus caballina 
 Ficus cahuitensis 
 Ficus calcarata 
 Ficus calcicola 
 Ficus caldasiana 
 Ficus calimana 
 Ficus callophylla 
 Ficus callosa 
 Ficus calopilina 
 Ficus calyculata 
 Ficus calyptrata 
 Ficus calyptroceras 
 Ficus cambodica 
 Ficus camptandra 
 Ficus capillipes 
 Ficus capreifolia 
 Ficus carautana 
 Ficus carchiana 
 Ficus carica 
 Ficus carinata 
 Ficus carpentariensis 
 Ficus carpenteriana 
 Ficus carrii 
 Ficus cartagenensis 
 Ficus carvajalii 
 Ficus casapiensis 
 Ficus casearioides 
 Ficus cassidyana 
 Ficus castellviana 
 Ficus catappifolia 
 Ficus cataractorum 
 Ficus cataupi 
 Ficus caulocarpa 
 Ficus cauta 
 Ficus cavernicola 
 Ficus celebensis 
 Ficus cerasicarpa 
 Ficus cereicarpa 
 Ficus ceronii 
 Ficus cervantesiana 
 Ficus cestrifolia 
 Ficus chaetostyla 
 Ficus changii 
 Ficus chapaensis 
 Ficus chaparensis 
 Ficus chaponensis 
 Ficus chartacea 
 Ficus chiangraiensis 
 Ficus chirindensis 
 Ficus chlamydocarpa 
 Ficus chocoensis 
 Ficus christianii 
 Ficus chrysochaete 
 Ficus chrysolepis 
 Ficus cinnamomea 
 Ficus citrifolia 
 Ficus clusiifolia 
 Ficus coerulescens 
 Ficus colobocarpa 
 Ficus colubrinae 
 Ficus comitis 
 Ficus complexa 
 Ficus concinna 
 Ficus congesta 
 Ficus conglobata 
 Ficus conocephalifolia 
 Ficus conraui 
 Ficus consociata 
 Ficus copiosa 
 Ficus cordata 
 Ficus cordatula 
 Ficus cornelisiana 
 Ficus corneri 
 Ficus corneriana 
 Ficus coronata 
 Ficus coronulata 
 Ficus costaricana 
 Ficus costata 
 Ficus cotinifolia 
 Ficus cotopaxiensis 
 Ficus crassicosta 
 Ficus crassinervia 
 Ficus crassipes 
 Ficus crassiramea 
 Ficus crassiuscula 
 Ficus crassivenosa 
 Ficus crateriformis 
 Ficus craterostoma 
 Ficus cremersii 
 Ficus crescentioides 
 Ficus crocata 
 Ficus cryptosyce 
 Ficus cuatrecasasiana 
 Ficus cucurbitina 
 Ficus cumingii 
 Ficus cundinamarcensis 
 Ficus cupulata 
 Ficus curtipes 
 Ficus cuspidata 
 Ficus cyathistipula 
 Ficus cyathistipuloides 
 Ficus cyclophylla 
 Ficus cynaroides 
 Ficus cyrtophylla

D

 Ficus daimingshanensis 
 Ficus dalbertisii 
 Ficus dalhousiae 
 Ficus dammaropsis 
 Ficus davidsoniae 
 Ficus decipiens 
 Ficus delosyce 
 Ficus deltoidea 
 Ficus demeusei 
 Ficus dendrocida 
 Ficus densechini 
 Ficus densifolia 
 Ficus densistipulata 
 Ficus depressa 
 Ficus destruens 
 Ficus detonsa 
 Ficus devestiens 
 Ficus dewolfii 
 Ficus diamantina 
 Ficus diamantiphylla 
 Ficus diandra 
 Ficus dicranostyla 
 Ficus dimorpha 
 Ficus dinganensis 
 Ficus dissipata 
 Ficus disticha 
 Ficus distichoidea 
 Ficus diversiformis 
 Ficus dodsonii 
 Ficus donnell-smithii 
 Ficus drupacea 
 Ficus dryepondtiana 
 Ficus duartei 
 Ficus duckeana 
 Ficus dugandii 
 Ficus dulciaria 
 Ficus dzumacensis

E

 Ficus ecuadorensis 
 Ficus edanoi 
 Ficus edelfeltii 
 Ficus elastica 
 Ficus elasticoides 
 Ficus eliadis 
 Ficus elmeri 
 Ficus endochaete 
 Ficus endospermifolia 
 Ficus enormis 
 Ficus erecta 
 Ficus erinobotrya 
 Ficus ernanii 
 Ficus erythrosperma 
 Ficus esquirolii 
 Ficus estanislana 
 Ficus eumorpha 
 Ficus eustephana 
 Ficus exasperata 
 Ficus excavata 
 Ficus eximia

F

 Ficus faulkneriana 
 Ficus fengkaiensis 
 Ficus fergusonii 
 Ficus filicauda 
 Ficus fischeri 
 Ficus fiskei 
 Ficus fistulosa 
 Ficus flagellaris 
 Ficus flavistipulata 
 Ficus floccifera 
 Ficus floresana 
 Ficus formosana 
 Ficus forstenii 
 Ficus francisci 
 Ficus francoae 
 Ficus fraseri 
 Ficus fresnoensis 
 Ficus fulva 
 Ficus fulvopilosa 
 Ficus funiculicaulis 
 Ficus funiculosa 
 Ficus fuscata 
 Ficus fusuiensis

G

 Ficus gamostyla 
 Ficus garcia-barrigae 
 Ficus geniculata 
 Ficus geocarpa 
 Ficus geocharis 
 Ficus gibbsiae 
 Ficus gigantifolia 
 Ficus gigantosyce 
 Ficus gilapong 
 Ficus glaberrima 
 Ficus glabristipulata 
 Ficus glandifera 
 Ficus glandulifera 
 Ficus glareosa 
 Ficus globosa 
 Ficus glumosa 
 Ficus godeffroyi 
 Ficus goiana 
 Ficus goldmanii 
 Ficus gomelleira 
 Ficus goniophylla 
 Ficus gorontaloensis 
 Ficus gracillima 
 Ficus granatum 
 Ficus grandiflora 
 Ficus gratiosa 
 Ficus greenwoodii 
 Ficus grevei 
 Ficus grewiifolia 
 Ficus griffithii 
 Ficus grossularioides 
 Ficus gryllus 
 Ficus guangxiensis 
 Ficus guaranitica 
 Ficus guatiquiae 
 Ficus guayaquilensis 
 Ficus guizhouensis 
 Ficus gul 
 Ficus guntheri 
 Ficus guttata 
 Ficus gymnorygma

H

 Ficus habrophylla 
 Ficus hadroneura 
 Ficus hahliana 
 Ficus halmaherae 
 Ficus hartwegii 
 Ficus hatschbachii 
 Ficus hebetifolia 
 Ficus hederacea 
 Ficus hemsleyana 
 Ficus henneana 
 Ficus henryi 
 Ficus herthae 
 Ficus hesperidiiformis 
 Ficus heteromorpha 
 Ficus heterophylla 
 Ficus heteropleura 
 Ficus heteropoda 
 Ficus heteroselis 
 Ficus heterostyla 
 Ficus hirsuta 
 Ficus hispida 
 Ficus holosericea 
 Ficus hombroniana 
 Ficus hondurensis 
 Ficus hookeriana 
 Ficus hotteana 
 Ficus humbertii 
 Ficus hurlimannii 
 Ficus hypobrunnea 
 Ficus hypogaea 
 Ficus hypophaea 
 Ficus hystricicarpa

I

 Ficus ihuensis 
 Ficus iidaiana 
 Ficus ilias-paiei 
 Ficus ilicina 
 Ficus illiberalis 
 Ficus imbricata 
 Ficus immanis 
 Ficus inaequifolia 
 Ficus inaequipetiolata 
 Ficus indigofera 
 Ficus ingens 
 Ficus insculpta 
 Ficus insipida 
 Ficus intramarginalis 
 Ficus involucrata 
 Ficus iodotricha 
 Ficus ischnopoda 
 Ficus itoana 
 Ficus ixoroides

J

 Ficus jacobii 
 Ficus jacobsii 
 Ficus jaheriana 
 Ficus jambiensis 
 Ficus jansii 
 Ficus jaramilloi 
 Ficus jarawae 
 Ficus jimiensis 
 Ficus johannis 
 Ficus juglandiformis

K

 Ficus kalimantana 
 Ficus kamerunensis 
 Ficus karthalensis 
 Ficus katendei 
 Ficus kerkhovenii 
 Ficus kjellbergii 
 Ficus kochummeniana 
 Ficus kofmaniae 
 Ficus koutumensis 
 Ficus krishnae 
 Ficus krugiana 
 Ficus krukovii 
 Ficus kuchinensis 
 Ficus kurzii

L

 Ficus lacor 
 Ficus laevicarpa 
 Ficus laevis 
 Ficus lagoensis 
 Ficus lamponga 
 Ficus lanata 
 Ficus lancibracteata 
 Ficus langkokensis 
 Ficus lapathifolia 
 Ficus lasiocarpa 
 Ficus lasiosyce 
 Ficus lateriflora 
 Ficus latimarginata 
 Ficus latipedunculata 
 Ficus laureola 
 Ficus lauretana 
 Ficus laurifolia 
 Ficus lawesii 
 Ficus lawrancei 
 Ficus lecardii 
 Ficus lehmannii 
 Ficus leiocarpa 
 Ficus leiophylla 
 Ficus leonensis 
 Ficus lepicarpa 
 Ficus leptocalama 
 Ficus leptoclada 
 Ficus leptodictya 
 Ficus leptogramma 
 Ficus lifouensis 
 Ficus lilliputiana 
 Ficus limosa 
 Ficus linearifolia 
 Ficus lingua 
 Ficus litseifolia 
 Ficus longecuspidata 
 Ficus longibracteata 
 Ficus longifolia 
 Ficus longistipulata 
 Ficus louisii 
 Ficus lowii 
 Ficus lumutana 
 Ficus luschnathiana 
 Ficus lutea 
 Ficus lyrata

M

 Ficus macbridei 
 Ficus machetana 
 Ficus machupicchuensis 
 Ficus macilenta 
 Ficus maclellandii 
 Ficus macrophylla 
 Ficus macropodocarpa 
 Ficus macrorrhyncha 
 Ficus macrostyla 
 Ficus macrosyce 
 Ficus macrothyrsa 
 Ficus madagascariensis 
 Ficus magdalenica 
 Ficus magnoliifolia 
 Ficus magwana 
 Ficus maialis 
 Ficus maitin 
 Ficus malayana 
 Ficus manuselensis 
 Ficus mariae 
 Ficus marmorata 
 Ficus maroma 
 Ficus maroniensis 
 Ficus masonii 
 Ficus matanoensis 
 Ficus mathewsii 
 Ficus matiziana 
 Ficus mauritiana 
 Ficus maxima 
 Ficus maximoides 
 Ficus megaleia 
 Ficus megalophylla 
 Ficus meistosyce 
 Ficus melinocarpa 
 Ficus membranacea 
 Ficus menabeensis 
 Ficus merrittii 
 Ficus mexicana 
 Ficus microcarpa 
 Ficus microdictya 
 Ficus microsphaera 
 Ficus microsyce 
 Ficus microtophora 
 Ficus middletonii 
 Ficus midotis 
 Ficus minahassae 
 Ficus miqueliana 
 Ficus mollicula 
 Ficus mollior 
 Ficus mollis 
 Ficus mollissima 
 Ficus montana 
 Ficus morobensis 
 Ficus mucuso 
 Ficus muelleriana 
 Ficus multistipularis 
 Ficus mutabilis 
 Ficus mutisii 
 Ficus myiopotamica

N

 Ficus nana 
 Ficus napoensis 
 Ficus nasuta 
 Ficus natalensis 
 Ficus nebulosilvana 
 Ficus neriifolia 
 Ficus nervosa 
 Ficus nhatrangensis 
 Ficus nigropunctata 
 Ficus nigrotuberculata 
 Ficus nishimurae 
 Ficus nitidifolia 
 Ficus nota 
 Ficus novae-georgiae 
 Ficus novahibernica 
 Ficus nymphaeifolia

O

 Ficus obliqua 
 Ficus obpyramidata 
 Ficus obscura 
 Ficus obtusifolia 
 Ficus obtusiuscula 
 Ficus ocoana 
 Ficus odoardi 
 Ficus odorata 
 Ficus oleifolia 
 Ficus oleracea 
 Ficus opposita 
 Ficus oreodryadum 
 Ficus oreophila 
 Ficus oresbia 
 Ficus orocuensis 
 Ficus orthoneura 
 Ficus osensis 
 Ficus otophora 
 Ficus otophoroides 
 Ficus ottoniifolia 
 Ficus ovatacuta 
 Ficus oxymitroides

P

 Ficus pachyclada 
 Ficus pachyneura 
 Ficus pachyrrhachis 
 Ficus pachysycia 
 Ficus padana 
 Ficus pakkensis 
 Ficus pallescens 
 Ficus pallida 
 Ficus palmarensis 
 Ficus palmata 
 Ficus paludica 
 Ficus pancheriana 
 Ficus pandurata 
 Ficus pantoniana 
 Ficus panurensis 
 Ficus paoana 
 Ficus papuana 
 Ficus paracamptophylla 
 Ficus paraensis 
 Ficus parietalis 
 Ficus parvibracteata 
 Ficus pastasana 
 Ficus patellata 
 Ficus pedunculosa 
 Ficus pellucidopunctata 
 Ficus pendens 
 Ficus peninsula 
 Ficus perfulva 
 Ficus periptera 
 Ficus pertusa 
 Ficus petiolaris 
 Ficus phaeobullata 
 Ficus phaeosyce 
 Ficus phanrangensis 
 Ficus phatnophylla 
 Ficus pilulifera 
 Ficus pisocarpa 
 Ficus platyphylla 
 Ficus platypoda 
 Ficus plectonervata 
 Ficus pleiadenia 
 Ficus pleurocarpa 
 Ficus pleyteana 
 Ficus podocarpifolia 
 Ficus polita 
 Ficus politoria 
 Ficus polyantha 
 Ficus polynervis 
 Ficus polyphlebia 
 Ficus pongumphaii 
 Ficus popayanensis 
 Ficus popenoei 
 Ficus populifolia 
 Ficus porata 
 Ficus porphyrochaete 
 Ficus porrecta 
 Ficus praestans 
 Ficus praetermissa 
 Ficus prasinicarpa 
 Ficus preussii 
 Ficus primaria 
 Ficus pringlei 
 Ficus pritchardii 
 Ficus profusa 
 Ficus prolixa 
 Ficus prostrata 
 Ficus pseudocaulocarpa 
 Ficus pseudoconcinna 
 Ficus pseudojaca 
 Ficus pseudomangifera 
 Ficus pseudopalma 
 Ficus pseudowassa 
 Ficus pteroporum 
 Ficus pubigera 
 Ficus pubilimba 
 Ficus pubipetiola 
 Ficus pulchella 
 Ficus pumila 
 Ficus punctata 
 Ficus pungens 
 Ficus pustulata 
 Ficus pygmaea 
 Ficus pyriformis

Q

 Ficus quercetorum 
 Ficus quichauensis 
 Ficus quichuana 
 Ficus quistocochensis

R

 Ficus racemifera 
 Ficus racemigera 
 Ficus racemosa 
 Ficus recurva 
 Ficus recurvata 
 Ficus reflexa 
 Ficus religiosa 
 Ficus remifolia 
 Ficus retusa 
 Ficus rheedei 
 Ficus rhizophoriphylla 
 Ficus ribes 
 Ficus richteri 
 Ficus ridleyana 
 Ficus rieberiana 
 Ficus riedelii 
 Ficus rigo 
 Ficus rimacana 
 Ficus rivularis 
 Ficus robusta 
 Ficus romeroi 
 Ficus roraimensis 
 Ficus rosulata 
 Ficus rubiginosa 
 Ficus rubra 
 Ficus rubrijuvenis 
 Ficus rubrivestimenta 
 Ficus rubrocuspidata 
 Ficus rubromidotis 
 Ficus rubrosyce 
 Ficus ruficaulis 
 Ficus ruginervia 
 Ficus rumphii 
 Ficus ruspolii 
 Ficus ruyuanensis 
 Ficus rzedowskiana

S

 Ficus sabahana 
 Ficus saccata 
 Ficus sageretina 
 Ficus sagittata 
 Ficus sagittifolia 
 Ficus salicaria 
 Ficus salicifolia 
 Ficus salomonensis 
 Ficus samarana 
 Ficus samoensis 
 Ficus sandanakana 
 Ficus sangumae 
 Ficus sansibarica 
 Ficus santanderiana 
 Ficus sarawakensis 
 Ficus sarmentosa 
 Ficus saruensis 
 Ficus satterthwaitei 
 Ficus saurauioides 
 Ficus saussureana 
 Ficus saxophila 
 Ficus scaberrima 
 Ficus scabra 
 Ficus scaposa 
 Ficus scassellatii 
 Ficus schefferiana 
 Ficus schippii 
 Ficus schumacheri 
 Ficus schumanniana 
 Ficus schwarzii 
 Ficus sciaphila 
 Ficus sclerosycia 
 Ficus scobina 
 Ficus scopulifera 
 Ficus scott-elliottii 
 Ficus scratchleyana 
 Ficus segoviae 
 Ficus semicordata 
 Ficus semivestita 
 Ficus septica 
 Ficus serraria 
 Ficus setiflora 
 Ficus setulosa 
 Ficus simplicissima 
 Ficus singalana 
 Ficus sinociliata 
 Ficus sinuata 
 Ficus sirensis 
 Ficus smithii 
 Ficus soatensis 
 Ficus sodiroi 
 Ficus soepadmoi 
 Ficus sohotonensis 
 Ficus solomonensis 
 Ficus sorongensis 
 Ficus spathulifolia 
 Ficus sphenophylla 
 Ficus spiralis 
 Ficus squamosa 
 Ficus stellaris 
 Ficus stipata 
 Ficus stolonifera 
 Ficus storckii 
 Ficus stricta 
 Ficus stuhlmannii 
 Ficus subapiculata 
 Ficus subcaudata 
 Ficus subcongesta 
 Ficus subcordata 
 Ficus subcostata 
 Ficus subcuneata 
 Ficus subfulva 
 Ficus subgelderi 
 Ficus subglabritepala 
 Ficus subincisa 
 Ficus sublimbata 
 Ficus submontana 
 Ficus subnervosa 
 Ficus subpisocarpa 
 Ficus subpuberula 
 Ficus subsagittifolia 
 Ficus subsidens 
 Ficus subterranea 
 Ficus subtrinervia 
 Ficus subulata 
 Ficus suffruticosa 
 Ficus sulawesiana 
 Ficus sulcata 
 Ficus sumacoana 
 Ficus sumatrana 
 Ficus sundaica 
 Ficus superba 
 Ficus supfiana 
 Ficus supperforata 
 Ficus sur 
 Ficus sycomorus

T

 Ficus talbotii 
 Ficus tamayoana 
 Ficus tannoensis 
 Ficus tanypoda 
 Ficus tarennifolia 
 Ficus temburongensis 
 Ficus tenuicuspidata 
 Ficus tepuiensis 
 Ficus tequendamae 
 Ficus ternatana 
 Ficus tesselata 
 Ficus tettensis 
 Ficus thailandica 
 Ficus theophrastoides 
 Ficus thonningii 
 Ficus tikoua 
 Ficus tiliifolia 
 Ficus tinctoria 
 Ficus tonduzii 
 Ficus tonsa 
 Ficus torrentium 
 Ficus torresiana 
 Ficus tovarensis 
 Ficus trachelosyce 
 Ficus trachycoma 
 Ficus trachypison 
 Ficus trapezicola 
 Ficus travancorica 
 Ficus tremula 
 Ficus treubii 
 Ficus trianae 
 Ficus trichocarpa 
 Ficus trichocerasa 
 Ficus trichoclada 
 Ficus trichopoda 
 Ficus tricolor 
 Ficus trigona 
 Ficus trigonata 
 Ficus triloba 
 Ficus trimenii 
 Ficus triradiata 
 Ficus tristaniifolia 
 Ficus trivia 
 Ficus tsiangii 
 Ficus tsjakela 
 Ficus tubulosa 
 Ficus tulipifera 
 Ficus tunicata 
 Ficus tuphapensis 
 Ficus turrialbana

U

 Ficus ulei 
 Ficus ulmifolia 
 Ficus umbellata 
 Ficus umbonata 
 Ficus umbrae 
 Ficus uncinata 
 Ficus uniauriculata 
 Ficus uniglandulosa 
 Ficus urnigera 
 Ficus ursina 
 Ficus usambarensis

V

 Ficus vaccinioides 
 Ficus valaria 
 Ficus vallis-caucae 
 Ficus vallis-choudae 
 Ficus variegata 
 Ficus variifolia 
 Ficus variolosa 
 Ficus vasculosa 
 Ficus vasta 
 Ficus velutina 
 Ficus venezuelensis 
 Ficus vermifuga 
 Ficus verruculosa 
 Ficus versicolor 
 Ficus verticillaris 
 Ficus vieillardiana 
 Ficus villosa 
 Ficus virens 
 Ficus virescens 
 Ficus virgata 
 Ficus vitiensis 
 Ficus vittata 
 Ficus vogeliana 
 Ficus vrieseana

W

 Ficus wakefieldii 
 Ficus wamanguana 
 Ficus warburgii 
 Ficus wassa 
 Ficus watkinsiana 
 Ficus webbiana 
 Ficus wildemaniana

X

 Ficus xylophylla

Y

 Ficus yoponensis 
 Ficus ypsilophlebia 
 Ficus yunnanensis

Z

 Ficus zuliensis

References

External links

List
Ficus